The Men's 1500 metre freestyle event at the 2010 Commonwealth Games took place on 8 and 9 October 2010, at the SPM Swimming Pool Complex.

Two heats were held. The heat in which a swimmer competed did not formally matter for advancement, as the swimmers with the top eight times from the entire field qualified for the finals.

Heats

Heat 1

Heat 2

Final

References

Aquatics at the 2010 Commonwealth Games